Jack David Fischer (born January 23, 1974) is an American engineer, test pilot and a former NASA astronaut. Fischer was selected in June 2009 as a member of the NASA Astronaut Group 20 and qualified as an astronaut in 2011. He made his first spaceflight in April 2017, as a flight engineer for Expedition 51/52 on the International Space Station.

Personal
Fischer was born January 23, 1974, in Louisville, Colorado. He is married to the former Elizabeth Simonson from Boulder, Colorado. They have two daughters. Fischer's father, Gary Fischer, is deceased, and his mother, JoBelle Fischer, still lives near Louisville, Colorado.

Education
In 1992, he graduated from Centaurus High School, in Lafayette, Colorado. He received his Bachelor of Science degree in Astronautical Engineering at the U.S. Air Force Academy in 1996. He completed a Master of Science degree in Aeronautics and Astronautics at the Massachusetts Institute of Technology in 1998.

U.S. Air Force service

Fischer is a Colonel in the U.S. Air Force. He attended Specialized Undergraduate Pilot Training at Laughlin Air Force Base, Texas, in 1998. Afterwards he attended F-15E Strike Eagle training at Seymour-Johnson Air Force Base, North Carolina, before being assigned as an operational pilot in the 391st Fighter Squadron Bold Tigers.

Fischer served two combat tours in Southwest Asia following September 11, 2001, and was part of Operation Enduring Freedom and Operation Southern Watch over Afghanistan and Iraq.

He is a 2004 graduate of the U.S. Air Force Test Pilot School (Class 03B) at Edwards Air Force Base, California, and was presented with the Onizuka Prop Wash Award.

In 2006, Fischer again returned to Edwards Air Force Base, as part of the F-22 Combined Test Force and 411th Flight Test Squadron testing the F-22 Raptor. In 2008, he was selected as a Strategic Policy Intern in Washington, D.C. While serving at The Pentagon, Fischer served in the Chairman's Action Group for the Chairman of the Joint Chiefs of Staff and in the Space and Intelligence Capabilities Office with the Senior Advisor for the Under Secretary of Defense for Acquisition, Technology and Logistics.

Colonel Fischer is an Air Force Command Pilot with 3,000 flight hours in more than 45 types of aircraft.

NASA career
Fischer was selected in June 2009 as a member of the NASA Astronaut Group 20 and qualified as an astronaut in 2011.
Fischer has worked in the Capsule Communicator (CAPCOM) Soyuz, International Space Station Operations, International Space Station Integration, and Exploration branches of the Astronaut Office.

In 2013, Fisher served as cavenaut into the ESA CAVES training in Sardinia, alongside Jeremy Hansen, Michael Barratt, Satoshi Furukawa, Aleksei Ovchinin and Paolo Nespoli.

Expedition 51/52

Originally assigned to the Expedition 52/53 crew, he was reassigned to launch aboard Soyuz MS-04 to the ISS in April 2017 as a flight engineer for Expedition 51/52.

Fischer launched aboard MS-04 on April 20, 2017. They docked with the station approximately 6 hours after launch, being the first crew of a Soyuz-MS series to make the shorter 6 hour rendezvous instead of the 2 day orbital rendezvous of the previous launches.

On May 13, 2017, Fischer performed his first career EVA with Peggy Whitson. The EVA was shortened due to an issue ahead of the spacewalk where the spacewalkers had to share a SCU (Service Cooling Unit) line after the umbilical for Fischer's EMU suffered from a leak. His suit was in good shape, but the line could not be used. The impact on the EMU battery life meant the full EVA duration couldn't be conducted. They replaced an avionics box on the starboard truss called an ExPRESS Logistics Carrier (ELC), a storage platform. The duration was 4 hours and 13 minutes, and it was the 200th EVA to be performed on the ISS.

On May 23, 2017, Fischer performed his second EVA with Whitson. They replaced a backup multiplexer-demultiplexer (MDM) unit that had failed on May 20, 2017. The duration was 2 hours and 46 minutes.

Fischer returned to Earth along with Peggy Whitson and Fyodor Yurchikhin aboard Soyuz MS-04 on September 3, 2017. The overall duration of his stay in space was 135 days, 18 hours and 8 minutes.

On May 24, 2018, he announced his early retirement from NASA to return to Air Force Service.

References

External links

 
Spacefacts biography of Jack D. Fischer

"A Passion For Space" an article by Fischer, June 23, 2009, Spaceref.com

1974 births
Living people
People from Louisville, Colorado
United States Air Force Academy alumni
MIT School of Engineering alumni
U.S. Air Force Test Pilot School alumni
United States Air Force astronauts
United States Air Force officers
American test pilots
American aerospace engineers
Aviators from Colorado
Crew members of the International Space Station
Recipients of the Meritorious Service Medal (United States)
Spacewalkers
Military personnel from Colorado